Eva is an unincorporated community and census-designated place (CDP) in Benton County, Tennessee, United States, on the western shore of the Kentucky Lake impoundment of the Tennessee River. It is the site of Nathan Bedford Forrest State Park. As of the 2010 census, its population was 293. The ZIP Code Tabulation Area for the ZIP code (38333) that serves Eva had a population of 574 as of the 2000 U.S. Census, when Eva was not yet a CDP.  Eva is centered on the junction of State Route 191, which connects the community to Nathan Bedford Forrest State Park to the north and the town of Camden to the south, and Eva Beach Road, which stretches from the center of the community to its beach along Kentucky Lake.

According to local lore, Eva was named after a friend of the daughter of Benton County land speculator A.W. Lucas. In 1913, Lucas donated land for a church and school that became the core of the community.

In 1940, before the Tennessee River was dammed to form Kentucky Lake, University of Tennessee archaeologists excavated a rich archaeological site at Eva, containing the remains of a series of prehistoric Native American encampments dating from the Archaic Period. The earliest remains at the site, with a radiocarbon date of 5200 B.C., contained artifacts from a group of hunting and gathering people who were named the Eva culture after the site, which is now submerged by the reservoir.

Demographics

References

External links
Benton County Chamber of Commerce

Census-designated places in Tennessee
Unincorporated communities in Tennessee
Census-designated places in Benton County, Tennessee
Tennessee populated places on the Tennessee River